Ananta Kumar Malo (born 1962) is an Indian Politician and Businessman of All India United Democratic Front  from Assam. He was elected in the Assam Legislative Assembly representing Abhayapuri South constituency from 2016 to 2021.

References 

Living people
All India United Democratic Front politicians
People from Dhubri district
Assam MLAs 2016–2021
1962 births